Degenerate music was a label applied in the 1930s by the government of Nazi Germany to certain forms of music that it considered harmful or decadent. The Nazi government's concerns about degenerate music were a part of its larger and better-known campaign against degenerate art. In both cases, the government attempted to isolate, discredit, discourage, or ban the works.

Racial emphasis
Jewish composers such as Felix Mendelssohn and Gustav Mahler were disparaged and condemned by the Nazis. In Leipzig, a bronze statue of Mendelssohn was removed. The regime commissioned music to replace his incidental music to A Midsummer Night's Dream.

Though the Nazis wanted to discredit Jewish artists because of their ethnicity, they also wanted to have a better reason . The excuse was that some music was "anti-German" and that was why some songs needed to be banned . The certainty of this philosophy was contrasted by the inability to say what counted as "anti-German" . Many people, like Goebbels, could not point to what was German music and what had a "Jewish influence". Goebbels said "all music was not suited for everyone".

The Nazis also regulated jazz, including the banning of solos and drum breaks, scat, "Negroid excesses in tempo" and "Jewishly gloomy lyrics".

Discrimination
From the Nazi seizure of power onward, these composers found it increasingly difficult, and often impossible, to get work or have their music performed. Many went into exile (e.g., Arnold Schoenberg, Kurt Weill, Paul Hindemith, Berthold Goldschmidt); or retreated into "internal exile" (e.g., Karl Amadeus Hartmann, Boris Blacher); or ended up in the concentration camps (e.g., Viktor Ullmann, or Erwin Schulhoff).

Like degenerate art, examples of degenerate music were displayed in public exhibits in Germany beginning in 1938. One of the first of these was organized in Düsseldorf by Hans Severus Ziegler, at the time superintendent of the Deutsches Nationaltheater Weimar, who explained in an opening speech that the decay of music was "due to the influence of Judaism and capitalism".

Ziegler's exhibit was organized into seven sections, devoted to:
 The influence of Judaism
 Arnold Schoenberg
 Kurt Weill and Ernst Krenek
 Minor Bolsheviks (Franz Schreker, Alban Berg, Ernst Toch, etc.)
 Leo Kestenberg, director of musical education before 1933
 Hindemith's operas and oratorios
 Igor Stravinsky

From the mid-1990s the Decca Record Company released a series of recordings under the title "Entartete Musik: Music Suppressed by the Third Reich", covering lesser-known works by several of the above-named composers.

See also
Cultural Bolshevism
Low culture
Music in Nazi Germany
Negermusik
Reich Music Examination Office
Reichsmusikkammer
Swing Kids

References 

Sources

Further reading
Dümling, Albrecht. 2002. "The Target of Racial Purity: The 'Degenerate Music' Exhibition in Düsseldorf, 1938". In Art, Culture, and Media Under the Third Reich, edited by Richard A. Etlin, 43–72. Chicago Series in Law and Society. Chicago: University of Chicago Press. .
Haas, Michael. 2013. Forbidden Music: The Jewish Composers Banned by the Nazis. New Haven and London: Yale University Press.  (cloth);  (pbk).
Levi, Erik. 1994. Music in the Third Reich. New York: St Martin's Press.  (cloth);  (pbk).
Potter, Pamela M. 2006. "Music in the Third Reich: The Complex Task of 'Germanization' ". In The Arts in Nazi Germany: Continuity, Conformity, Change, edited by Jonathan Huener and Francis R. Nicosia, 85–110. New York and Oxford: Berghan Books. .

External links 

"Degenerate" Music in Nazi Germany
" 'Degenerate' Music", A Teacher's Guide to The Holocaust, College of Education, University of South Florida
Database of "degenerate" music composers, ebonyband.nl

Nazi culture
Modernism (music)
Nazi terminology
Classical music in Germany
20th-century classical music
20th century in jazz
Jewish music
Censorship in Germany
Censorship in the arts
Censorship of music
Music controversies